The Virginia Slims of Tucson is a defunct WTA Tour affiliated tennis tournament played from 1972 to 1973. It was held in Tucson, Arizona in the United States and played on indoor carpet courts.

Past finals

Singles

Doubles

External links
 WTA Results Archive

Indoor tennis tournaments
Carpet court tennis tournaments
Virginia Slims tennis tournaments
Defunct tennis tournaments in the United States
Women's sports in Arizona